Moonee Valley Racecourse, currently marketed as The Valley, is a horse-racing track in Moonee Ponds, Melbourne, Victoria Australia.

History 
Moonee Valley Racecourse was established in 1883 by William Samuel (W.S.) Cox, who purchased a farm the previous year belonging to John F. Feehan for the purpose of establishing a racetrack. Being entirely freehold land owned by a private club, this separates Moonee Valley from other Melbourne racecourses such as Caulfield and Flemington. Expansion of the racecourse facilities occurred in the 1960s, funded by compensation for land acquired for the construction of the adjacent Tullamarine Freeway. In the 1970s harness racing moved to the Valley, when night trotting relocated from the Royal Melbourne Showgrounds.

References

External links
MVRC official website

Horse racing venues in Australia
Harness racing in Australia
Sports venues in Melbourne
Sports venues completed in 1883
1883 establishments in Australia
Buildings and structures in the City of Moonee Valley
Sport in the City of Moonee Valley